Abacophrastus is a genus of beetles in the family Carabidae, containing the following species:

 Abacophrastus bellorum Will, 2011
 Abacophrastus carnifex Will, 2011
 Abacophrastus chapes Will, 2011
 Abacophrastus hobbit Will, 2011
 Abacophrastus megalops Will, 2011
 Abacophrastus millei Will, 2011
 Abacophrastus reflexus Will, 2011

References

Pterostichinae